Everett Earl "Ed" Taylor (born May 13, 1953) is a former American football defensive back in the National Football League (NFL). He was drafted by the New York Jets in the ninth round of the 1975 NFL Draft. He played college football at Memphis.

Taylor also played for the Miami Dolphins.

External links
New York Jets bio

1953 births
Living people
American football cornerbacks
American football safeties
Memphis Tigers football players
New York Jets players
Miami Dolphins players